"", or "God Bless Fiji", is the national anthem of Fiji. The lyrics were written by Michael Francis Alexander Prescott (1928–2006) to the tune of the hymn "Dwelling in Beulah Land" by Charles Austin Miles (1911), and the music was adapted by Viliame Bale, Superintendent and Director of Music in the Royal Fiji Police Band. The anthem was adopted upon independence from the United Kingdom in 1970.

Lyrics 
The anthem's English version is usually sung. The English and Fijian lyrics are not translations of each other and have very little in common.

In August 2008, the draft version of the People's Charter for Change, Peace and Progress, a government document intended to supplement the Constitution and reconcile ethnic and linguistic divides, suggested that the national anthem should be in the country's three main languages: Fijian, Hindi and English. The Charter later served as the basis for the 2013 Constitution of Fiji.

English lyrics

Fijian lyrics

Hindi lyrics

See also
 Modern history of Fiji

Notes

References

Oceanian anthems
National symbols of Fiji
Fijian music
National anthems
National anthem compositions in B-flat major
Fijian-language songs